Kryptos is a sculpture by the American artist Jim Sanborn located on the grounds of the Central Intelligence Agency (CIA) headquarters, the George Bush Center for Intelligence in Langley, Virginia. Since its dedication on November 3, 1990, there has been much speculation about the meaning of the four encrypted messages it bears. Of these four messages, the first three have been solved, while the fourth message remains one of the most famous unsolved codes in the world. The sculpture continues to be of interest to cryptanalysts, both amateur and professional, who are attempting to decipher the fourth passage. The artist has so far given four clues to this passage.

Description 

The main part of the sculpture is located in the northwest corner of the New Headquarters Building courtyard, outside of the Agency's cafeteria. The sculpture comprises four large copper plates with other elements consisting of water, wood, plants, red and green granite, white quartz, and petrified wood. The most prominent feature is a large vertical S-shaped copper screen resembling a scroll or a piece of paper emerging from a computer printer, half of which consists of encrypted text. The characters are all found within the 26 letters of the Latin alphabet, along with question marks, and are cut out of the copper plates. The main sculpture contains four separate enigmatic messages, three of which have been deciphered.

In addition to the main part of the sculpture, Jim Sanborn also placed other pieces of art at the CIA grounds, such as several large granite slabs with sandwiched copper sheets outside the entrance to the New Headquarters Building. Several morse code messages are found on these copper sheets, and one of the stone slabs has an engraving of a compass rose pointing to a lodestone. Other elements of Sanborn's installation include a landscaped garden area, a fish pond with opposing wooden benches, a reflecting pool, and other pieces of stone including a triangle-shaped black stone slab.

The name Kryptos comes from the ancient Greek word for "hidden", and the theme of the sculpture is "Intelligence Gathering".

The cost of the sculpture in 1988 was US $250,000 (worth US $501,000 in 2016).

Encrypted messages 
The ciphertext on the left-hand side of the sculpture (as seen from the courtyard) of the main sculpture contains 869 characters in total: 865 letters and 4 question marks (spacing is important).

In April 2006, however, Sanborn released information stating that a letter was omitted from this side of Kryptos "for aesthetic reasons, to keep the sculpture visually balanced".

There are also three misspelled words in the plaintext of the deciphered first three passages, which Sanborn has said was intentional, and three letters (YAR) near the beginning of the bottom half of the left side are the only characters on the sculpture in superscript.

The right-hand side of the sculpture comprises a keyed Vigenère encryption tableau, consisting of 867 letters.

One of the lines of the Vigenère tableau has an extra character (L). Bauer, Link, and Molle suggest that this may be a reference to the Hill cipher as an encryption method for the fourth passage of the sculpture.  However, Sanborn omitted the extra letter from small Kryptos models that he sold.

Sanborn worked with a retiring CIA employee named Ed Scheidt, Chairman of the CIA Office of Communications, to come up with the cryptographic systems used on the sculpture.

Sanborn has revealed that the sculpture contains a riddle within a riddle, which will be solvable only after the four encrypted passages have been deciphered.

He has given conflicting information about the sculpture's answer, saying at one time that he gave the complete solution to the then-CIA director William Webster during the dedication ceremony; but later, he also said that he had not given Webster the entire solution. He did, however, confirm that a passage of the plaintext of the second message reads "Who knows the exact location? Only WW."

Sanborn also confirmed that should he die before the entire sculpture becomes deciphered, there will be someone able to confirm the solution. In 2020, Sanborn stated that he planned to put the secret to the solution up for auction once he dies.

Solvers 
The first person to announce publicly that he had solved the first three passages was Jim Gillogly, a computer scientist from southern California, who deciphered these passages using a computer, and revealed his solutions in 1999.

After Gillogly's announcement, the CIA revealed that their analyst David Stein had solved the same passages in 1998 using pencil and paper techniques, although at the time of his solution the information was only disseminated within the intelligence community. No public announcement was made until July 1999, although in November 1998 it was revealed that "a CIA analyst working on his own time [had] solved the lion's share of it".

The NSA claimed that some of their employees had solved the same three passages but would not reveal names or dates until March 2000, when it was learned that an NSA team led by Ken Miller, along with Dennis McDaniels and two other unnamed individuals, had solved passages 1–3 in late 1992. In 2013, in response to a Freedom of Information Act request by Elonka Dunin, the NSA released documents that show these attempts to solve the Kryptos puzzle in 1992, following a challenge by Bill Studeman, then Deputy Director of the CIA. The documents show that by June 1993, a small group of NSA cryptanalysts had succeeded in solving the first three passages of the sculpture.

The above attempts to solve Kryptos all had found that passage 2 ended with WESTIDBYROWS. However, in 2005, Dr Nicole Friedrich, a logician from Vancouver, Canada, determined that another possible plaintext was: WESTPLAYERTWO. Dr. Friedrich solved the ending to section K2 from a clue that became apparent after she had determined a running cipher of K4 that resulted in an incomplete but partially legible K4 plaintext, involving text such as XPIST, REALIZE, AYD EQ HR, and others, but the find that instigated her discovery of K2 plaintext was the clue WESTX.

On April 19, 2006, Sanborn contacted an online community dedicated to the Kryptos puzzle to inform them that what was once the accepted solution to passage 2 was incorrect. Sanborn said that he made an error in the sculpture by omitting an S in the ciphertext (an X in the plaintext), and he confirmed that the last passage of the plaintext was WESTXLAYERTWO, and not WESTIDBYROWS.

Solutions 
The following are the solutions of passages 1–3 of the sculpture.

Misspellings present in the text are included verbatim.

Solution of passage 1 

Method: Vigenère

Keywords: Kryptos, Palimpsest

BETWEEN SUBTLE SHADING AND THE ABSENCE OF LIGHT LIES THE NUANCE OF IQLUSION

Iqlusion was an intentional misspelling of illusion.

Solution of passage 2 

Method:  Vigenère

Keywords: Kryptos, Abscissa

IT WAS TOTALLY INVISIBLE HOWS THAT POSSIBLE ? THEY USED THE EARTHS MAGNETIC FIELD X THE INFORMATION WAS GATHERED AND TRANSMITTED UNDERGRUUND TO AN UNKNOWN LOCATION X DOES LANGLEY KNOW ABOUT THIS ? THEY SHOULD ITS BURIED OUT THERE SOMEWHERE X WHO KNOWS THE EXACT LOCATION ? ONLY WW THIS WAS HIS LAST MESSAGE X THIRTY EIGHT DEGREES FIFTY SEVEN MINUTES SIX POINT FIVE SECONDS NORTH SEVENTY SEVEN DEGREES EIGHT MINUTES FORTY FOUR SECONDS WEST X LAYER TWO

The coordinates mentioned in the plaintext, have been interpreted using a modern Geodetic datum as indicating a point that is approximately 174 feet (53 meters) southeast of the sculpture.

Solution of passage 3 

Method: Transposition

SLOWLY DESPARATLY SLOWLY THE REMAINS OF PASSAGE DEBRIS THAT ENCUMBERED THE LOWER PART OF THE DOORWAY WAS REMOVED WITH TREMBLING HANDS I MADE A TINY BREACH IN THE UPPER LEFT HAND CORNER AND THEN WIDENING THE HOLE A LITTLE I INSERTED THE CANDLE AND PEERED IN THE HOT AIR ESCAPING FROM THE CHAMBER CAUSED THE FLAME TO FLICKER BUT PRESENTLY DETAILS OF THE ROOM WITHIN EMERGED FROM THE MIST X CAN YOU SEE ANYTHING Q ?

This is a paraphrased quotation from Howard Carter's account of the opening of the tomb of Tutankhamun on November 26, 1922, as described in his 1923 book The Tomb of Tutankhamun. The question with which it ends is asked by Lord Carnarvon, to which Carter (in the book) famously replied "wonderful things". In the November 26, 1922, field notes, however, his reply was, "Yes, it is wonderful".

Clues given for passage 4 

When commenting in 2006 about his error in passage 2, Sanborn said that the answers to the first three passages contain clues to the fourth passage. In November 2010, Sanborn released a clue, publicly stating that "NYPVTT", the 64th–⁠69th letters in passage four, become "BERLIN" after decryption.

Sanborn gave The New York Times another clue in November 2014: the letters "MZFPK", the 70th–⁠74th letters in passage four, become "CLOCK" after decryption. The 74th letter is K in both the plaintext and ciphertext, meaning that it is possible for a character to encrypt to itself. This means it does not have the weakness, where a character could never be encrypted as itself, that was known to be inherent in the German Enigma machine.

Sanborn further stated that in order to solve passage 4, "You'd better delve into that particular clock," but added, "There are several really interesting clocks in Berlin." The particular clock in question is presumably the Berlin Clock, although the Alexanderplatz World Clock and Clock of Flowing Time are other candidates.

The clock in Berlin referred to may be a time that is famous in the history of World War 2. "This morning the British Ambassador in Berlin handed the German Government a final note, stating that, unless we heard from them by 11 o'clock that they were prepared at once to withdraw their troops from Poland, a state of war would exist between us. I have to tell you now that no such undertaking has been received and that consequently this country is at war with Germany."

 — Neville Chamberlain, 3 September 1939 

In an article published on January 29, 2020, by the New York Times, Sanborn gave another clue: at positions 26–34, ciphertext "QQPRNGKSS" is the word "NORTHEAST".

In August 2020, Sanborn revealed that the four letters in positions 22–25, ciphertext "FLRV", in the plaintext are "EAST". Sanborn commented that he "released this layout to several people as early as April". The first person known to have shared this hint more widely was Sukhwant Singh.

There are some suggestions about the relationship between K4 and the Enigma machine. The initial German Patent of the Enigma machine is DE385682 (19 May 1922). The number 385682 closely resembles the coordinates ", LAYER 2" shown in the K2 plain text, and the scene depicted in the K3 plain text (Opening Tutankhamun's Tomb by Howard Carter) occurred in the same year 1922.

Related sculptures 
Kryptos was the first cryptographic sculpture made by Sanborn.

After producing Kryptos he went on to make several other sculptures with codes and other types of writing, including one entitled Antipodes, which is at the Hirshhorn Museum in Washington, D.C., an "Untitled Kryptos Piece" that was sold to a private collector, and Cyrillic Projector, which contains encrypted Russian Cyrillic text that included an extract from a classified KGB document.

The cipher on one side of Antipodes repeats the text from Kryptos. Much of the cipher on Antipodes other side is duplicated on Cyrillic Projector. The Russian portion of the cipher found on Cyrillic Projector and Antipodes was solved in 2003 by Frank Corr and Mike Bales independently from each other with translation from Russian plaintext provided by Elonka Dunin.

Ex Nexum was installed in 1997 at Little Rock Old U.S. Post Office & Courthouse.

Some additional sculptures by Sanborn include Native American texts: Rippowam was installed at the University of Connecticut, in Stamford in 1999, while Lux was installed in 2001 at an old US Post Office building in Fort Myers, Florida. Iacto is located at the University of Iowa, between the Adler Journalism Building and Main Library.

Indian Run is located next to the U.S. Federal Courthouse in Beltsville, Maryland, and contains a bronze cylinder perforated with the text of the Iroquois Book of the Great Law.
This document includes the contribution of the indigenous peoples to the United States legal system. 
The text is written in Onondaga and was transcribed from the ancient oral tradition of five Iroquois nations.

A,A was installed at the Plaza in front of the new library at the University of Houston, in Houston, Texas, in 2004, and Radiance was installed at the Department of Energy, Coast, and Environment, Louisiana State University, Baton Rouge in 2008.

In popular culture 
The dust jacket of the US version of Dan Brown's 2003 novel The Da Vinci Code contains two references to Kryptos—one on the back cover (coordinates printed light red on dark red, vertically next to the blurbs) is a reference to the coordinates mentioned in the plaintext of passage 2 (see above), except the degrees digit is off by one. When Brown and his publisher were asked about this, they both gave the same reply: "The discrepancy is intentional".  The coordinates were part of the first clue of the second Da Vinci Code WebQuest, the first answer being Kryptos. The other reference is hidden in the brown "tear" artwork—upside-down words which say "Only WW knows", which is another reference to the second message on Kryptos.

Kryptos features in Dan Brown's 2009 novel The Lost Symbol.

A small version of Kryptos appears in the season 5 episode of Alias "S.O.S.". In it, Marshall Flinkman, in a small moment of comic relief, says he has cracked the code just by looking at it during a tour visit to the CIA office. The solution he describes sounds like the solution to the first two parts.

In the season 2 episode of The King of Queens "Meet By-Product", a framed picture of Kryptos hangs on the wall by the door.

The progressive metal band Between the Buried and Me has a reference to Kryptos in their song "Obfuscation" from their 2009 album, The Great Misdirect.

Kryptos features in several of M. L. Buchman's Miranda Chase series titles including Drone, Thunderbird, Ghostrider, and White Top.

James Ponti's young adult novel City Spies: City of the Dead uses Kryptos and the online community of cryptographers seeking to solve K4 as a means of passing messages between a cryptographer and a deep cover spy.

See also 
 A,A
 Copiale cipher
 History of cryptography
 Voynich manuscript

Notes

References

Books 
 (contains 1–2 pages about Kryptos)

Journal articles

Conference papers

Articles 
 Kryptos 1,735 Alphabetical letters
 "Gillogly Cracks CIA Art", & "The Kryptos Code Unmasked", 1999, New York Times and Cypherpunks archive
 "Unlocking the secret of Kryptos", March 17, 2000, Sun Journal
 "Solving the Enigma of Kryptos", January 26, 2005, Wired, by Kim Zetter
 "Interest grows in solving cryptic CIA puzzle after link to Da Vinci Code", June 11, 2005, The Guardian
 "Cracking the Code", June 19, 2005, CNN
 Mission Impossible: The Code Even the CIA Can't Crack

External links 

 Jim Sanborn's official Kryptos webpage by Jim Sanborn
 Kryptos website maintained by Elonka Dunin (includes Kryptos FAQ, transcript, pictures and links)
 Kryptos photos by Jim Gillogly
 Washington Post: Cracking the Code of a CIA Sculpture
 Wired : Documents Reveal How the NSA Cracked the Kryptos Sculpture Years Before the CIA
 PBS : Segment (Video) on Kryptos from Nova ScienceNow
 The General Services Administration Kryptos webpage 
  The General Services Administration Ex Nexum webpage 
  The General Services Administration Indian Run webpage 
  The General Services Administration Binary Systems webpage
  The Central Intelligence Agency Kryptos webpage
  The National Security Agency Kryptos webpage
 The Kryptos Project by Julie (Jew-Lee) Irena Lann
 Nicole (Monet) Friedrich's Kryptos Observations
 Patrick Foster's Kryptos page
 A practical introduction to brute-force decryption of Kryptos passages 1-3

1990 establishments in Virginia
1990 sculptures
Buildings and structures in Fairfax County, Virginia
Central Intelligence Agency
Copper sculptures in the United States
Granite sculptures in Virginia
History of cryptography
McLean, Virginia
Outdoor sculptures in Virginia
Riddles
Sculptures by Jim Sanborn
Stone sculptures in Virginia
Undeciphered historical codes and ciphers
Wooden sculptures in the United States